Ronell Earl Wilson (born May 4, 1982) is an American murderer who was convicted of the 2003 capital murder of two undercover New York City police officers in Staten Island, New York. His trial before Judge Nicholas Garaufis of the United States District Court for the Eastern District of New York began on November 27, 2006. On December 20, 2006, he was found guilty of the capital murders as well as other related charges. On January 30, 2007, Wilson was sentenced to death, the first such sentence by a federal jury in New York since the federal death penalty was reinstated in 1988.

Prosecutors alleged Wilson was the leader of a violent drug gang called the Stapleton Crew (witnesses at the trial denied using that label) that originated in the Stapleton Public housing projects of Staten Island. He was convicted for murdering NYPD Detectives James Nemorin and Rodney Andrews in a gun sale, then searching their bodies and stealing their car. The victims' family members and fellow police officers greeted pronouncement of his death sentence with cheers and applause; Wilson reacted by sticking his tongue out in their direction.
 
The case has attracted media attention because of the brutality of the murders as well as the rarity of a capital prosecution in New York. Wilson is the first person federally sentenced to death in New York in over 50 years. Wilson was originally charged in New York state court, but the federal government took over the prosecution after the New York Court of Appeals held that the state's death penalty statute violated the New York State Constitution. Wilson was held at the United States Penitentiary in Terre Haute, Indiana.

In 2010 the Second Circuit Court of Appeals reversed Wilson's sentence. In the sentencing phase, the prosecutor "argued: [i] that Wilson put the government to its proof of guilt rather than plead guilty; and [ii] that Wilson's allocution of remorse should be discredited because he failed to testify notwithstanding the fact that "the path for that witness stand has never been blocked for Mr. Wilson." As to the first argument, although a guilty plea may properly be considered to support a sentence mitigation for acceptance of responsibility, the Sixth Amendment is violated when failure to plead guilty is treated as an aggravating circumstance. As to the second, it is a fair argument for the prosecution to say that an allocution of remorse is unsworn and uncrossed, but the Fifth Amendment is violated when the defendant is denied a charge that limits the Fifth Amendment waiver to that which is said in the allocution and the jury is invited to consider more generally that the defendant declined to testify." Because these constitutional violations were not harmless beyond a reasonable doubt, the court vacated Wilson's and his co-defendants' death sentences and remanded to the trial court for re-sentencing. The government's petition for rehearing en banc was denied on October 19, 2010.

After Wilson's death sentence was vacated by the Second Circuit Court of Appeals, he was moved from the United States Penitentiary in Terre Haute, Indiana to the Metropolitan Detention Center (MDC) in Brooklyn, New York. While in the MDC, he fathered a child with Federal Officer Nancy Gonzalez during an illicit rendezvous in the staff bathroom on July 15, 2012. On March 22, 2013, Gonzalez gave birth to a son they named Justus. The Wilson's attorneys are pressing an argument stating that he is mentally disabled and therefore not eligible for the death penalty based on the 2002 U.S. Supreme Court ruling outlawing the execution of mentally disabled offenders.

The prosecutor in the original case, Jack Smith, served as chief of the Public Integrity Section of the Department of Justice and as special counsel investigating Donald Trump.

On July 24, 2013, a Brooklyn federal jury sentenced Wilson to death for the 2003 murders, reinstating the previous death sentence that was thrown out in 2010. During his direct appeal, the Second Circuit Court of Appeals remanded the case to the district court with direction to reconsider, in light of an intervening Supreme Court case, the district court’s earlier ruling that Wilson is not intellectually disabled. 

On March 15, 2016, Judge Garaufis concluded that Wilson was mentally handicapped, making him ineligible for execution under the Eighth Amendment. Federal prosecutors later announced they would not appeal this ruling. Wilson was resentenced to life in prison without parole. As of 2020, Wilson is serving his sentence at USP Canaan in Waymart, Pennsylvania.  

Wilson's BOP register number is 71460-053.

References

External links
Inmate Locator. Federal Bureau of Prisons. Retrieved on 2007-11-25.
U.S. Court Strikes Down Death Sentence for Killer of Two New York Officers. Retrieved on 2010-06-30

1982 births
Living people
American prisoners sentenced to death
American people convicted of murdering police officers
People convicted of murder by the United States federal government
Prisoners sentenced to death by the United States federal government